Liberty Township is one of sixteen townships in Hancock County, Iowa, USA.  As of the 2000 census, its population was 276.

History
Liberty Township was originally called German Township, and under the latter name was organized in 1878. It was originally settled chiefly by Germans, hence its former name.

In the 20th century, German Township was renamed Liberty Township due to Anti-German sentiment during World War I.

Geography
According to the United States Census Bureau, Liberty Township covers an area of 36.14 square miles (93.61 square kilometers); of this, 36.09 square miles (93.48 square kilometers, 99.86 percent) is land and 0.05 square miles (0.13 square kilometers, 0.14 percent) is water.

Adjacent townships
 Garfield Township (north)
 Concord Township (northeast)
 Ell Township (east)
 Avery Township (southeast)
 Twin Lake Township (south)
 Amsterdam Township (southwest)
 Erin Township (west)
 Britt Township (northwest)

Cemeteries
The township contains Liberty Cemetery.

Major highways
  U.S. Route 69

School districts
 Belmond-Klemme Community School District
 Garner-Hayfield-Ventura Community School District
 West Hancock Community School District

Political districts
 Iowa's 4th congressional district
 State House District 12
 State Senate District 6

References
 United States Census Bureau 2008 TIGER/Line Shapefiles
 United States Board on Geographic Names (GNIS)
 United States National Atlas

External links
 US-Counties.com
 City-Data.com

Townships in Hancock County, Iowa
Townships in Iowa